Melba Doretta Liston (January 13, 1926 – April 23, 1999) was an American jazz trombonist, arranger, and composer. Other than those playing in all-female bands, she was the first woman trombonist to play in big bands during the 1940s and 1960s, but as her career progressed she became better known as an arranger, particularly in partnership with pianist Randy Weston. Other major artists with whom she worked include Dizzy Gillespie, Billie Holiday, John Coltrane, and Count Basie.

Biography

Early life and education 
Liston was born in Kansas City, Missouri. At the age of seven, Liston's mother purchased her a trombone and she began learning to play.  Her family encouraged her musical pursuits, as they were all music lovers. Liston was primarily self-taught, but she was "encouraged by her guitar-playing grandfather", with whom she spent significant time learning to play spirituals and folk songs. At the age of eight, she was good enough to be a solo act on a local radio station. At the age of 10, she moved to Los Angeles, California. She was classmates with Dexter Gordon, and friends with Eric Dolphy. After playing in youth bands and studying with Alma Hightower for three years, she decided to become a professional musician and joined the big band led by Gerald Wilson in 1943.

Career 
Liston joined the Musicians Union (Local 474, the Colored Musicians Union) at the age of 16 in order to accept her first professional job with the Lincoln Theater pit band. She and Dexter Gordon began playing music together at the ages of fourteen and seventeen, respectively, and she recorded with Gordon in 1947. When Wilson disbanded his orchestra in 1948, Liston joined Dizzy Gillespie's big band in New York, which included saxophonists John Coltrane, Paul Gonsalves, and pianist John Lewis, after being sought out personally by the bandleader for her talents as both a trombonist and as an arranger. Liston performed in a supporting role and was nervous when asked to take solos, but with encouragement she became more comfortable as a featured voice in bands, though it was her innovative jazz arrangements that legitimized her presence in a very male-dominated environment. She toured with Count Basie, then with Billie Holiday (1949) but was so profoundly affected by the indifference of the audiences and the rigors of the road that she gave up playing and turned to education. Liston taught for about three years.

She took a clerical job for some years and supplemented her income by taking work as an extra in Hollywood, appearing with Lana Turner in The Prodigal (1955) and in The Ten Commandments (1956). Liston returned to Gillespie for tours sponsored by the U.S. State Department in 1956 and 1957, recorded with Art Blakey's Jazz Messengers (1957), and formed an all-women quintet in 1958. In 1959, she visited Europe with the show Free and Easy, for which Quincy Jones was the music director. She accompanied Billy Eckstine with the Quincy Jones Orchestra on At Basin Street East, released on October 1, 1961, by Verve.

In the late 1950s, she began collaborating with pianist Randy Weston, arranging compositions (primarily his own) for mid-size to large ensembles. This association, especially strong in the 1960s, would be rekindled in the late 1980s and 1990s until her death. In addition, she worked with  Milt Jackson, Clark Terry, and Johnny Griffin, as well as working as an arranger for Motown, appearing on albums by Ray Charles. In 1964, she helped establish the Pittsburgh Jazz Orchestra. In 1971 she was chosen as musical arranger for Stax recording artist Calvin Scott, whose album was being produced by Stevie Wonder's first producer, Clarence Paul. On this album she worked with Joe Sample and Wilton Felder of the Jazz Crusaders, blues guitarist Arthur Adams, and jazz drummer Paul Humphrey. She worked with youth orchestras in Watts, California before accepting an invitation from the Government of Jamaica in 1973 to become the Director of Afro-American Pop and Jazz at the Jamaica School of Music. She returned to the U.S. in 1979 where she was honored at the first Women's Jazz Festival in Kansas City, Missouri, and the Salute to Women in Jazz in New York, later forming a new band, Melba Liston and Company.

During her time in Jamaica, she composed and arranged music for the 1975 comedy film Smile Orange, starring Carl Bradshaw, who three years earlier starred in the first Jamaican film, The Harder They Come (1972). She also served as composer, arranger, and musical director of The Dread Mikado, a theater production considered emblematic of the Jamaican cultural revolution.

She was forced to give up playing in 1985 after a stroke left her partially paralyzed, but she continued to arrange music with Randy Weston. In 1987, she was awarded a Jazz Masters Fellowship from the National Endowment for the Arts.

Death 
After suffering repeated strokes, Liston died in Los Angeles, California on April 23, 1999, a few days after a tribute to her and Randy Weston's music at Harvard University. Her funeral at St. Peter's in Manhattan featured performances by Weston with Jann Parker, as well as by Chico O'Farrill's Afro-Cuban ensemble and by Lorenzo Shihab (vocals).

Composing and arranging
Liston was already writing and arranging music while in high school and she viewed that work as the central contribution of her career, stating on numerous occasions throughout her life that she preferred writing music to playing and soloing.

Her early work with the high-profile bands of Count Basie and Dizzy Gillespie shows a strong command of the big-band and bop idioms. She worked as an arranger for numerous recording companies, especially Motown, and arranged scores for dozens of high profile musicians, including Clark Terry, Marvin Gaye, Mary Lou Williams, and Gloria Lynne. 

However, perhaps her most important work was written for Randy Weston, with whom she collaborated on and off for four decades from the late 1950s into the 1990. Her work with Weston has been compared to  the collaborations of Billy Strayhorn and Duke Ellington. 

Liston worked as a "ghost writer" during her career. According to one writer, "Many of the arrangements found in the Gillespie, Jones, and Weston repertoires were accomplished by Liston."

Legacy
Liston was a female in a profession of mostly males. Although some consider her an unsung hero, she is highly regarded in the jazz community. Liston was a trailblazer as a trombonist, composer, and a woman. She articulated difficulties of being a woman on the road:

"There's those natural problems on the road, the female problems, the lodging problems, the laundry, and all those kinda things to try to keep yourself together, problems that somehow or other the guys don't seem to have to go through."

She goes on to recount the struggles she experienced as an African-American woman, which affected her musical career. However, she generally spoke positively about the camaraderie with and support from male musicians. Liston also dealt with larger issues of inequity in the music industry. One writer has said, "It was clear that she had to continually prove her credentials in order to gain suitable employment as a musician, composer, and arranger. She was not paid equitable scale and was often denied access to the larger opportunities as a composer and arranger."

Musical style
Liston's musical style reflects bebop and post-bop sensibilities learned from Dexter Gordon, Dizzy Gillespie, and Art Blakey. Her earliest recorded work—such as Gordon's "Mischievous Lady" a tribute to her—her solos show a blend of motivic and linear improvisation, though they seem to make less use of extended harmonies and alterations.

Her arrangements, especially those with Weston, show a flexibility that transcends her musical upbringing in the bebop 1940s, whether working in the styles of swing, post-bop, African musics, or Motown. Her command of rhythmic gestures, grooves, and polyrhythms is particularly notable (as illustrated in Uhuru Afrika and Highlife). Her instrumental parts demonstrate an active use of harmonic possibilities; although her arrangements suggest relatively subdued interest in the explorations of free jazz ensembles, they use an extended tonal vocabulary, rich with altered harmonic voicings, thick layering, and dissonance. Her work throughout her career has been well received by both critics and audiences alike.

Discography

As leader
 Melba Liston and Her 'Bones (MetroJazz, 1959)
 Volcano Blues with Randy Weston (Antilles, 1993)

As sidewoman or guest
With Art Blakey & the Jazz Messengers
 1957: Art Blakey Big Band
 1957: Theory of Art
 1965: Hold On, I'm Coming

With Betty Carter
 1958: Out There with Betty Carter
 1961: I Can't Help It

With Ray Charles
 1959: The Genius of Ray Charles
 1962: The Ray Charles Story, Vol. 2

With Dizzy Gillespie
 1955: Jazz Recital 
 1956: World Statesman
 1957: Dizzy Gillespie at Newport
 1957: Birks' Works
 1957: Dizzy in Greece

With Quincy Jones
 1959: The Birth of a Band! 
 1960: Swiss Radio Days Jazz Series, Vol. 1
 1960: I Dig Dancers
 1961: Newport '61
 1961: The Great Wide World of Quincy Jones: Live!
 1962: The Quintessence
 1963: Plays Hip Hits
 1965: I/We Had a Ball
 1965: Quincy Plays for Pussycats

With Jimmy Smith
 1963: Any Number Can Win
 1966: Jimmy & Wes
 1966: The Further Adventures of Jimmy and Wes
 1966: Hoochie Coochie Man
 1969: Jimmy Smith Plays the Blues

With Dinah Washington
 1957: Dinah Washington Sings Fats Waller
 1958: Dinah Washington Sings Bessie Smith

With Randy Weston

 1958: Little Niles
 1959: Destry Rides Again
 1959: Live at the Five Spot
 1961: Uhuru Afrika
 1963: Highlife - Music from the new African nations featuring the Highlife
 1973: Tanjah
 1992: The Spirits of Our Ancestors
 1993: Volcano Blues
 1997: Earth Birth
 1998: Khepera

With others
 1957: Last Chorus, Ernie Henry
 1958: Back on the Scene, Bennie Green
 1959: Rhythm Crazy, Jimmy Cleveland
 1959: Tales of Manhattan, Babs Gonzales
 1960: Trane Whistle, Eddie "Lockjaw" Davis
 1961: African Waltz, Cannonball Adderley
 1961: At Basin Street East, Billy Eckstine/Quincy Jones
 1961: Rah, Mark Murphy
 1961: The Chant, Sam Jones
 1961: The Soul of Hollywood, Junior Mance
 1962: Afro-American Sketches, Oliver Nelson
 1962: Big Bags, Milt Jackson
 1962: Bursting Out with the All Star Big Band!, Oscar Peterson
 1962: Rhythm Is My Business, Ella Fitzgerald
 1962: Snap Your Fingers, Al Grey
 1962: The Complete Town Hall Concert, Charles Mingus
 1962: This Is Billy Mitchell Featuring Bobby Hutcherson, Billy Mitchell
 1963: For Someone I Love, Milt Jackson
 1963: The Body & the Soul, Freddie Hubbard
 1964: Mary Lou Williams Presents Black Christ of the Andes, Mary Lou Williams
 1965: And Then Again, Elvin Jones
 1966: Roll 'Em: Shirley Scott Plays the Big Bands, Shirley Scott
 1967: A Mann & A Woman, Tamiko Jones/Herbie Mann
 1967: Heads Up, Blue Mitchell
 1968: Listen Here, Freddie McCoy
 1970: Kim Kim Kim, Kim Weston
 1973: That Lovin' Feelin' , Junior Mance
 1978: Skylark, Freddie Hubbard

References

Further reading
 Black Music Research Journal, Vol. 34, No. 1 (Spring 2014). Special issue devoted to Melba Liston.
 Ammer, Christine. 2001. Unsung: A History of Women in American Music, 2nd ed. Portland, OR: Amadeus.
 Dahl, Linda. 1984. Stormy Weather: The Music and Lives of a Century of Jazzwomen. New York: Pantheon.
 Hughes, Langston. 1960. Liner notes, Uhuru Afrika. (See discography.)

External links
Interview of Melba Liston, Center for Oral History Research, UCLA Library Special Collections, University of California, Los Angeles.
 "Melba Liston: Bones of an Arranger", NPR
 "Melba Liston: A Sensitive and Daring Arranger", The Scotsman
 "Melba Liston and Her 'Bones", All About Jazz
 Melba Liston at Women in Jazz
 Melba Liston with Randy Weston
 Liptrott, Josephine, "Biography: Melba Liston – Jazz Trombonist", The Heroine Collection, December 19, 2015.
 Guide to the Melba Liston Collection, Center for Black Music Research, Columbia College Chicago.

1926 births
1999 deaths
20th-century African-American musicians
20th-century African-American women
20th-century American composers
20th-century American women musicians
20th-century jazz composers
20th-century trombonists
20th-century women composers
African-American Catholics
African-American women musicians
American jazz composers
American jazz trombonists
American music arrangers
American women jazz musicians
Jazz musicians from Missouri
Musicians from Kansas City, Missouri
Women jazz composers
Women trombonists